The Girl Without a Homeland is a 1927 Austrian-German silent drama film directed by Constantin J. David and starring Jenny Hasselqvist, Henry Stuart, and Oskar Homolka.

The film's sets were designed by the art director .

Cast

References

Bibliography

External links

1927 films
1927 drama films
Films of the Weimar Republic
Austrian silent feature films
Austrian drama films
German silent feature films
German drama films
Films directed by Constantin J. David
German black-and-white films
Silent drama films
1920s German films
1920s German-language films